Adolfo "Fito" Andrés Ovalle Raffo (born April 28, 1997) is a Chilean footballer who plays as midfielder for Tacoma Defiance.

Early life
Ovalle grew up in Salt Lake City, Utah where his father, also named Adolfo Ovalle, ended his playing career and continued to reside after his playing career. Ovalle began playing with La Roca Futbol Club in South Weber, Utah, which was founded by his father. Afterwards, he joined Real Salt Lake Arizona, a satellite team of the Real Salt Lake Academy.

Club career
On March 6, 2015, Ovalle signed a homegrown contract with Real Salt Lake.  On March 22, he made his professional debut with USL affiliate club Real Monarchs SLC in a 0–0 draw against LA Galaxy II. He was waived on April 28, 2016.

On August 20, 2016, Ovalle signed a one-year deal with the Italian Lega Pro side Fidelis Andria. After being held back by a bad injury, he eventually joined Sambenedettese on loan in 2017 for six months, despite being pursued by Cardiff and Bolton as well.

In 2018, he joined Chilean club Rangers de Talca.

In 2019, he signed with Toronto FC II of USL League One. In 2020, after TFCII opted out of the 2020 season due to the COVID-19 pandemic, he went on loan to Forward Madison. His contract expired following the 2020 season. During the 2021 season, he trained with the Toronto FC first team for the bulk of the season, but was not officially added to the roster.

In April 2022, he signed with the Tacoma Defiance in MLS Next Pro.

International career
Ovalle has represented Chile in the under-20 level, making a total of four appearances. Along with the team, he won the L'Alcúdia Tournament in 2015.

Personal
He is the son of former footballer Adolfo Ovalle and the older brother of Nicolas Ovalle Raffo, who also is a professional player.

Honours
Chile U20
 L'Alcúdia International Tournament (1): 2015

References

External links
 

1997 births
Living people
People from Temuco
Chilean footballers
Chilean expatriate footballers
Chile under-20 international footballers
Association football midfielders
Real Salt Lake players
Real Monarchs players
S.S. Fidelis Andria 1928 players
A.S. Sambenedettese players
Rangers de Talca footballers
Toronto FC II players
Forward Madison FC players
Tacoma Defiance players
USL Championship players
Homegrown Players (MLS)
Major League Soccer players
Serie C players
Primera B de Chile players
USL League One players
MLS Next Pro players
Chilean expatriate sportspeople in the United States
Chilean expatriate sportspeople in Italy
Chilean expatriate sportspeople in Canada
Expatriate soccer players in the United States
Expatriate footballers in Italy
Expatriate soccer players in Canada